Testovskaya is a railway station of Line D1 of the Moscow Central Diameters in Moscow. It will be rebuilt by 2024.

Gallery

References

Railway stations in Moscow
Railway stations of Moscow Railway
Line D1 (Moscow Central Diameters) stations